Vũ Quang is a rural district of Hà Tĩnh province in the North Central Coast region of Vietnam. As of 2003 the district had a population of 32,242. The district capital lies at Vũ Quang.

Geography 
Vũ Quang is an area of steep mountains and dense tropical forest in Hà Tĩnh province of Vietnam's North Central Coast. It is a very wet, hot area, whose mountains trap moisture coming in from the South China Sea.  This creates a very stable but inhospitable climate. It rains continually in the rainy season, and in the dry season there is much fog; consequently most surfaces are algae-coated and slippery. The local hunters prefer to stay out of the forest, setting snares and using dogs to chase animals into more accessible areas.

History 
Vũ Quang was used as a base by Phan Đình Phùng, the anti-colonial revolutionary, from 1885 to 1896.

See also 
 Vũ Quang National Park

References

External links
 Time (magazine)
 http://www.birdlifeindochina.org/source_book/pdf/4%20North%20central%20Coast/Vu%20Quang.pdf

Districts of Hà Tĩnh province
Geography of Hà Tĩnh province